A by-election was held for the New South Wales Legislative Assembly seat of Dubbo on 6 June 1942. It was triggered by the death of George Wilson.

Dates

Results 

George Wilson died.

See also
Electoral results for the district of Dubbo
List of New South Wales state by-elections

References 

1942 elections in Australia
New South Wales state by-elections
1940s in New South Wales